AirPlus International (AirPlus Servicekarten GmbH) is a global handler of business travel payments covering corporate travel management. It is a subsidiary of Lufthansa Group.

The company provides business-to-business services around business travel payment, accounting, and analysis functions, in particular by issuing single-use virtual credit card numbers.  Airplus was handling  virtual credit card transactions per year.  In 2017 the company handled payments covering  travel tickets.

Company history
The company's tradition began in the year 1986 with the Air Travel Card (distributed by Lufthansa), now known as the Universal Air Travel Plan (UATP). As a result of being the first credit card, UATP/AirPlus card numbers start with the card issuer identification number prefix "1".

On 22 December 1989 Lufthansa AirPlus Servicekarten GmbH was registered at the court in Offenbach am Main, Hesse, Germany.

By 1993, the AirPlus credit card had 60,000 subscribers and was jointly owned by Aer Lingus, Alitalia, Austrian Airlines, British Airways, Finnair, Iberia, Lufthansa, Sabena and Swissair.

2000s
By 2000, AirPlus had enabled exporting of transaction information to SAP R/3 using an SAP module called "Sara" in the data format "Lars" (Lufthansa Airplus ).

AirPlus International Ltd is a wholly-owned subsidiary based in the United Kingdom and founded in 2002.

In 2005, AirPlus launched AIDA (AirPlus Integrated Data and Acceptance), a virtual credit card solution, whereby sixteen-digit payment card numbers are generated under the Mastercard prefix, which can be used for a limit number of transactions.

2010s
In 2013 Hotel Reservation Service (HRS) enabled automated payment to hotels using automatically generated virtual credit card numbers issued by AirPlus.

In 2017, the managing director Patrick Diemer predicted that most business travel processes would move to smartphones.
 AirPlus was working on implementation of the strong customer authentication requirements for corporate cards.
During 2018 Mastercard and AirPlus launched a joint marketing campaign called "Virtual Cards: Accepted!".

During 2021, all previous AIDA virtual credit cards were set to expire on 31 July 2021 and be replaced by a new virtual credit card system.

2021 proposed sale
Subsequently, at the beginning of 2021, Lufthansa had planned to sell AirPlus for  along with parts of Lufthansa Technik.

, Lufthansa had cancelled its previous plan to sell the majority of Airplus as a consequence of the COVID-19 pandemic in Germany.

Lufthansa previously planned to keep open the open of partially selling LSG Sky Chefs or AirPlus at a later stage.

References

Companies based in Hesse
Financial services companies established in 1986
Lufthansa Group
Payment systems
1986 establishments in Germany